Yiliu is a town in Ruyuan Yao Autonomous County, Guangdong, China.

Administrative division
As of 2016, the town is divided into one community and seven villages: 
 Weimin Community
 Yiliu
 Dongqi
 Dongfen
 Tuanjie
 Luowu
 Lequn
 Xi'an

History
After the establishment of the Communist State, it was known as "Yiliu Township". In 1974, it came under the jurisdiction of Ruyuan Yao Autonomous County, previously it belonged to Qujiang County. In 1986, it was upgraded to a town.

Geography
The town sits at northeastern Ruyuan Yao Autonomous County, it is surrounded by Youxi Town on the north, Dongping Town on the west, Wujiang District on the east, and Rucheng Town on the south.

Economy
The region abounds with tungsten, quartz bell, and beryl.

Demographics

As of 2018, the National Bureau of Statistics of China estimates the township's population now to be 17,560.

Transportation
The Provincial Highway S250 passes across the town northeast to southwest.

The G0423 Lechang–Guangzhou Expressway is a north–south expressway travels through the eastern town.

References

Bibliography

 

Divisions of Ruyuan Yao Autonomous County